The Cape Government Railways Type A 2-6-4T of 1902 was a South African steam locomotive from the pre-Union era in the Cape of Good Hope.

In 1902, the Cape Government Railways placed two Type A  narrow gauge steam locomotives in construction service on the Avontuur branch. In 1912, these locomotives were assimilated into the South African Railways and renumbered.

Langkloof railway
It was to become one of the most important narrow gauge railways in South Africa and passed through districts which were famous for general agriculture and the export of wheat and fruit, especially apples. The line was laid with  rail and was completed to Avontuur on 10 December 1906.

A load from Port Elizabeth to Avontuur had to be hauled up  and, on the return journey, . This, in conjunction with the innumerable sharp curves and steep gradients of 1 in 40 (2½%) compensated, prevented a continuous high speed from being attained.

Manufacturer

Two 2-6-4 Adriatic type narrow gauge tank steam locomotives were supplied to the Cape Government Railways (CGR) by Manning Wardle and Company in 1902. They were designated Type A and numbered 31 and 32.

It is recorded that these locomotives, during tests, were able to haul a load of  up a 1 in 40 (2½%) grade.

Service

Cape Government Railways
Both locomotives were placed in construction service on the Avontuur narrow gauge railway and were also used as the first road power on the railway.

South African Railways
When the Union of South Africa was established on 31 May 1910, the three Colonial government railways (CGR, Natal Government Railways and Central South African Railways) were united under a single administration to control and administer the railways, ports and harbours of the Union. Although the South African Railways and Harbours came into existence in 1910, the actual classification and renumbering of all the rolling stock of the three constituent railways were only implemented with effect from 1 January 1912.

The two locomotives were renumbered to NG25 and NG26 on the South African Railways (SAR), with the NG prefix identifying them as narrow gauge locomotives in the SAR registers. They remained in service on the Avontuur branch for the duration of their service lives, until they were withdrawn in 1929 without having been classified by the SAR.

References

0450
1C2 locomotives
2-6-4T locomotives
Manning Wardle locomotives
2 ft gauge locomotives
Railway locomotives introduced in 1902
1902 in South Africa
Scrapped locomotives